The Evangelical Church of Czech Brethren (ECCB) is the largest Czech Protestant church and the second-largest church in the Czech Republic after the Catholic Church. It was formed in 1918 in Czechoslovakia through the unification of the Protestant churches of the Lutheran and Calvinist confessions.

In 2019, the church reported 69,715 baptized members in more than 260 local congregations, which are broken down into 14 seniorates (presbyteries) throughout the Czech Republic. Numbers peaked in 1950 with 402,000 members; since Communist rule, the Czech Republic's censuses found 203,996 members in 1991, 117,212 in 2001, and 51,936 in 2011.

Origins
Reformation in the Czech lands started already in the 15th century, one century before the great Luther's Reformation. At that time, most Czechs (~85%) were Protestant; there were two Protestant churches: the Utraquist Hussite Church (1431–1620) and the Unity of the Brethren (1457–1620). (The latter was in the 1720s partially renewed outside of Czech territory as the Moravian Church) However, non-Catholic churches were forbidden in 1620 when the Bohemian Revolt was decisively defeated and victorious Habsburg rulers imposed harsh Counter-Reformation measures on the Bohemian Crown. This ban was mitigated in 1781 by issuing the Patent of Toleration that permitted Lutheran and Calvinist churches in the Habsburg monarchy (yet full equality with Catholic faith and equality before the law Protestants only obtained as late as in 1867, when Austria-Hungary was created). Nevertheless, other minor churches were still forbidden until the foundation of Czechoslovakia in 1918.

The ECCB was established in 1918 by unification of all Lutheran and Calvinist churches in Bohemia, Moravia and Silesia intending to be an successor of the Unity of the Brethren (and the Bohemian Reformation in general).

The ECCB is a member of the World Council of Churches, the Communion of Protestant Churches in Europe, the Conference of European Churches, the Lutheran World Federation and the World Communion of Reformed Churches.

References

Further reading

External links

 

Unity of the Brethren
Reformed denominations in Europe
Protestantism in the Czech Republic
Lutheranism in Europe
Members of the World Communion of Reformed Churches
Members of the World Council of Churches
Lutheran World Federation members